Goldman's warbler (Setophaga goldmani) is a songbird species in the New World warbler family (Parulidae). It is found in Mexico and Guatemala.

Taxonomy
This passerine bird was long known to be closely related to its counterparts Audubon's warbler and myrtle warbler, and at various times the three forms have been classed as either one, two or three species. At present, the American Ornithological Society and Clements considers the myrtle, Audubon's, and Goldman's warbler three subspecies of the yellow-rumped warbler (Setophaga coronata coronata, Setophaga coronata auduboni, and Setophaga coronata goldmani respectively) while the IOC World Bird List classifies the myrtle warbler, Audubon's, and Goldman's warbler as separate species (Setophaga coronata, Setophaga auduboni, and Setophaga goldmani).

References 

Gill F, D Donsker & P Rasmussen  (Eds). 2022. IOC World Bird List (v12.1).  

Birds of Guatemala
Birds of Mexico
Setophaga
Birds described in 1897